2 Fast 2 Furious is a racing video game developed by  Digital Bridges and published by dbi Games for mobile phones based on the film of the same name. It is the sequel to The Fast and the Furious and second game in the racing game series based on The Fast and the Furious franchise.

Gameplay 
The game utilizes a pseudo-3D engine with the player controlling the car from a third person perspective. The controls were designed to be simple, and integrate smoothly to any mobile button interface. Players can steer, accelerate, brake and use nitro while racing. The objective of the game is to win all twelve races in order and accrue the most money. The player's car is damaged when it collides with other cars, if it takes too much damage the player will have to abandon the race. Players can earn in-game money by winning race, this money is then used to purchase car upgrades in order to compete in more challenging races.

2 Fast 2 Furious was one of the earliest mobile games to take advantage of wireless internet, allowing players to connect to a wireless network and share high scores with other players. Players could also download a 'ghost' of another player, to compete against offline. 

The game also features the likeness of popular characters from The Fast and the Furious franchise, including Ludacris.

References 

2004 video games 
Racing video games 
Street racing video games
Fast & Furious video games 
Mobile games 
Java platform games 
Video games based on films
Video games set in the United States
Video games developed in the United States